Muddy most commonly means covered in mud.

Muddy may also refer to:

Places

Canada
 Muddy Bay, Newfoundland and Labrador
 Muddy Brook, Maberly, Newfoundland and Labrador

United States
 Muddy, Illinois, a village
 Muddy, Montana, a census-designated place
 Muddy Branch, Maryland, a tributary stream of the Potomac River
 Muddy Brook (disambiguation)
 Muddy Creek (disambiguation)
 Muddy Fork (Oregon), a tributary of the Sandy River
 Muddy Mountain, near Casper, Wyoming
 Muddy Mountains, Nevada
 Muddy Pass (disambiguation)
 Muddy River (disambiguation)
 Muddy Run (disambiguation)

Nickname or stage name
 Muddy Manninen (born 1957), Finnish guitarist
 Muddy Ruel (1896-1963), American professional baseball player
 Muddy Waters (1915-1983), American singer 
 Muddy Wilbury, (born 1950-2017) a stage name of Tom Petty while in the group the Traveling Wilburys

Arts and entertainment
 Muddy (film), 2021 Malayalam-language film
 Muddy Mole, the main character of the video game Mole Mania
 Muddy Mudskipper, a character from The Ren and Stimpy Show

See also

 Baseball rubbing mud
 
 
 Mud (disambiguation)